Roger Goree (born November 4, 1951) was a football player in the Canadian Football League for eight seasons. Goree played linebacker for the Calgary Stampeders and Saskatchewan Roughriders from 1973 to 1980. He played college football at Baylor University, where he was an All-American in 1972.

External links
Career Bio and Stats

1951 births
Living people
American players of Canadian football
Baylor Bears football players
Calgary Stampeders players
Canadian football linebackers
Saskatchewan Roughriders players